The Little Fork River (French: Rivière Petite Fourche; Ojibwe: Baaganowe-ziibi) is a river of Minnesota. It flows into the Rainy River.

See also
List of rivers of Minnesota
List of longest streams of Minnesota

References

Minnesota Watersheds
USGS Hydrologic Unit Map - State of Minnesota (1974)

Rivers of Minnesota